Rita Horky is a former women's basketball player and coach from Blissfield, Michigan. Horky was inducted into the Women's Basketball Hall of Fame in 2000.

Basketball career

Horky played for Nashville Business College. She also played for the Iowa Wesleyan College Tigerettes, an AAU team in 1959 and 1960. The 5 foot 11 inch guard was named AAU All-American five times. She was a Pan American gold medalist twice (1959 and 1963), the USA's leading scorer in 1959 with 11.9 points per game, and their 3rd leading scorer in 1963 with 7.7 points/game. Her team finished 4th in the World Championship in 1964 and 11th in 1967.

Horky coached the Northern Illinois women's basketball team for one year in 1982–83, leading them to a 13–14 record.

Awards and honors
In 2000, Horky was elected to the Women's Basketball Hall of Fame, located in Knoxville, Tennessee. She was elected to the Iowa Wesleyan Athletic Hall of Fame in 2004.

Notes

References

External links
 Women's Basketball Hall of Fame bio

Northern Illinois Huskies women's basketball coaches
Basketball coaches from Michigan
Basketball players from Michigan
Basketball players at the 1959 Pan American Games
Basketball players at the 1963 Pan American Games
American women's basketball coaches
People from Blissfield, Michigan
Pan American Games medalists in basketball
Pan American Games gold medalists for the United States
Medalists at the 1959 Pan American Games
Medalists at the 1963 Pan American Games